Tephriopis is a monotypic moth genus of the family Erebidae. Its only species, Tephriopis divulsa, was first described by Francis Walker in 1865.

Distribution
It is found in Sri Lanka, the Indian subregion, Bangladesh, Myanmar, Thailand, the Andaman Islands, Borneo and Sulawesi.

Description
Forewings have a striking pattern with black and grey. Body greenish brown with the dark bands broken by pale lines on the veins. Distal margin distinctly angled obtusely at the centre. Antennae of male serrate and strongly fasciculate. The caterpillar is cylindrical with a dark rusty-brown head mottled with green. Body pale ochraceous olive green with a smoky-brown suffusion. Pupation takes place in a cell of leaves made by silk. Pupa lacks bloom. Caterpillars are known to feed on Dalbergia and Pterocarpus species.

References

Calpinae
Monotypic moth genera
Moths of Asia
Moths described in 1865